Ali was the cousin and son-in-law of the Islamic prophet Muhammad.

Ali may also refer to:
Ali (name), the name and list of people of this name

Film
 Ali (actor)
Ali (film), 2001 biographical film about Muhammad Ali directed by Michael Mann
Ali: Fear Eats the Soul, a 1974 Rainer Werner Fassbinder film

Languages
Ali language, a language spoken in Central African Republic
Ali language (Papua New Guinea)

Music
Ali (American rapper), member of St. Lunatics
Ali (British singer) or Ali Tennant, British singer, songwriter and vocal producer/mentor
Ali (French rapper), originally Daddy Ali (born 1975), French rapper of Moroccan origin
Ali (French singer), a finalist at Eurovision France, c'est vous qui décidez! in 2021, a French singer of Lebanese origin 
Ali (South Korean singer) or Cho Yong-jin (born 1984), South Korean musician, singer, songwriter and actress
ALI (Alien Liberty International), a Japanese hip-hop/funk band
Ali Project, Japanese musical band
Ali (Mike G album), 2010 album by Mike G of Odd Future
Ali (Vieux Farka Touré and Khruangbin album), 2022 album

Places
A'ali, a place in Bahrain
Alì, a town in Italy
Ali, Ardabil, a village in Ardabil Province, Iran
Ali, Fars, a village in Fars Province, Iran
Ali, Khuzestan, a village in Khuzestan Province, Iran
Ali, Razavi Khorasan, a village in Razavi Khorasan Province, Iran
Ali, Kazakhstan, a village in Almaty Region of south-eastern Kazakhstan
Mount Ali in Taiwan
Ali, Tibet, a town
Ali Island in Papua New Guinea
Ali Prefecture, a prefecture in Tibet, China

Other uses
Ali (character), a cartoon character created by Xu Han
Storm Ali, a 2018 storm in Europe
Aluminium monoiodide or AlI, a chemical compound

See also
Alley
ALI (disambiguation)
Eli (disambiguation)